Falling from Grace is a 1992 American drama film directed by and starring John Mellencamp; it was met with more positive reviews than not.

The 100-minute drama film is the on-screen and directorial debut rock singer John Mellencamp.  It also stars Mariel Hemingway, Claude Akins, Dub Taylor, Kay Lenz, and Larry Crane.  Larry McMurtry's story closely follows one of Mellencamp's own: following a country-music celebrity who returns to Indiana with his wife (Hemingway), but cheats with a hometown lover (Lenz), repeating the spiraling lifestyle of his father (Akins).

Falling from Grace was released in the US by Columbia Pictures on February 21, 1992 to 22 theaters where the Motion Picture Association of America rated it as PG-13.  At 96 minutes, the film was released in the United Kingdom on October 1, 1992.

, review aggregator Rotten Tomatoes showed a 78-percent positive view of the film, based on nine film critics.

Soundtrack
The movie's 13-track soundtrack is 49 minutes and 43 seconds long, was recorded at the Belmont Mall Studio, and released in 1991.  AllMusic rated the album at 4.5 out of 5 stars.

References

External links
 
 

1990s American films
1990s English-language films
1992 directorial debut films
1992 drama films
1992 films
American drama films
Columbia Pictures films
country music films
films directed by John Mellencamp
films set in Indiana
films with screenplays by Larry McMurtry